Petriano is a comune (municipality) in the Province of Pesaro e Urbino in the Italian region Marche, located about  northwest of Ancona and about  southwest of Pesaro.

Petriano borders the following municipalities: Colbordolo, Montefelcino, Urbino.

Demographic evolution

References

Cities and towns in the Marche